Léopold-Émile Reutlinger (17 March 1863 – 16 March 1937) was a French photographer who came from a successful German-Jewish family of photographers. His uncle Charles Reutlinger founded the family's photography business, and his father was the photographer Émile Reutlinger. His son Jean Reutlinger was also a prominent photographer.

Life 
Born in Callao, Peru, Reutlinger became a photographer like his uncle and his father. He lived in Callao until 1883 and then, at his father's insistence, entered the studio in Paris, which his father had been running alone since 1880. He took over the studio from his father after 1890. Like his uncle, he took photos of popular actresses and opera singers from the beginning. Soon he also took fashion and advertising photos and photographed stars of the entertainment venues like the Moulin Rouge and the Folies Bergère. The photos were either sold to magazines and newspapers or reproduced as postcards. Especially the business with pictures in postcard format, which were often clearly influenced by Art Nouveau, was successful. Some of the pictures were colored and designed as photomontages.

Reutlinger had an excellent reputation at the age of 40. He clearly trumped his uncle's success. He recorded among others Mata Hari, Cléo de Mérode, Sarah Bernhardt, Léonie Yahne, Anna Held and Lina Cavalieri. Reutlinger was also one of the pioneers of erotic photography. 

In 1891 his son Jean was born, who worked together with his father as a photographer from 1910. Jean died in 1914 in World War I.

In 1930, Reutlinger suffered an accident with a champagne cork, which cost him an eye and seriously affected his profession. But he continued to run the studio until his death in Paris in 1937.

Gallery

References

Bibliography 
 Die Schonen von Paris: Fotografien aus der Belle Epoque, Leopold Reutlinger, 1981 
 Robert Lebeck: Leopold Reutlinger, 1979 
 Jean-Pierre Bourgeron: Les Reutlinger. Photographes à Paris 1850-1937, Grove art: Paris 1979,

Video 
 La Belle Otero sous l'objectif de Reutlinger (DVD), Édition du Compas 2009,

External links 

 Léopold-Émile Reutlinger (fr.)
 The Reutlinger family on Gallica

1863 births
1937 deaths
People from Callao
French people of German-Jewish descent
French photographers